Savalskogo lesnichestva is a rural locality (a settlement) in Ternovskoye Rural Settlement, Ternovsky District, Voronezh Oblast, Russia. The population was 55 as of 2010.

Geography
Savalskogo lesnichestva is located 195 km east of Voronezh. Ternovka is the nearest rural locality.

References 

Rural localities in Ternovsky District